Stewart Appleby may refer to:

Stewart H. Appleby (1890–1964), U.S. Representative from New Jersey
Stuart Appleby (born 1971), Australian golfer